Megali Panagia ("Great Panagia") is a common name found on churches, monasteries and towns in Greece to honor the Virgin Mary.

Megali Panagia may refer to:
Megali Panagia, Chalkidiki, a village in Chalkidiki peninsula and seat of old Panagia municipality
Church of Megali Panagia, a church built on the site of Hadrian's Library in Athens, now in ruins

Greek words and phrases
Mary, mother of Jesus